The 1996–97 Philadelphia Flyers season was the Philadelphia Flyers 30th season in the National Hockey League (NHL). The Flyers reached the Stanley Cup Finals but lost to the Detroit Red Wings in a four-game sweep.

Regular season
While Eric Lindros rehabbed from a bothersome groin injury, the Flyers treaded water through the early part of the schedule. They dropped the first-ever home game at the new CoreStates Center to the Florida Panthers, 3–1, on October 5, and lost again to their new rivals three weeks later. However, they rebounded to end the Panthers' season-opening 8–0–4 run with a 3–2 victory in Miami on November 2.

With John LeClair, Mikael Renberg, Dale Hawerchuk and Rod Brind'Amour expected to pick up the slack on offense, the club was inconsistent and went 12–10–1 prior to Lindros' return in a 2–0 loss in Boston on November 26. Another loss the next night to the Islanders dropped the team into fourth place, but the team soon caught fire, ripping off a 14–0–3 stretch from November 30 to January 7.

The run included an incredible stretch of four consecutive shutout wins in mid-December (Hartford, Boston, Islanders, St. Louis), a trade which netted high-scoring defenseman Paul Coffey and a thrilling come-from-behind 4–4 tie against the Colorado Avalanche in Denver on January 4.

In a 9–5 win over Montreal on February 6, the Legion of Doom line set a franchise-record with 16 points and spoiled the NHL debut of Tomas Vokoun, and in a 5–5 tie on March 1 in Boston, third-line winger Trent Klatt recorded his first (and only) 20-goal season with a hat trick.

A 2–3–2 finish which saw Lindros sit out a one-game suspension and the Devils vault over the team for first place in the Atlantic was mitigated when LeClair scored his 50th goal of the season in a 5–4 win over New Jersey in the final regular-season game.

Season standings

Playoffs
Backstopped by the goaltending tandem of Ron Hextall and Garth Snow, the Flyers dominated the Pittsburgh Penguins, the Buffalo Sabres, and the New York Rangers all in five games apiece to win the Eastern Conference championship, and clinch a berth in the Stanley Cup Finals for the first time since 1987. However, their opponent, the Detroit Red Wings, swept the Flyers in four straight games. After Game 3, Terry Murray said that the team was in a "choking situation." It is said this remark cost Murray his job, as he was fired less than a week after the conclusion of the finals.

Schedule and results

Regular season

|- style="background:#fcf;"
| 1 || October 5 || Florida Panthers || 1–3 || 0–1–0 || 0 || 
|- style="background:#cfc;"
| 2 || October 7 || New Jersey Devils || 3–1 || 1–1–0 || 2 || 
|- style="background:#cfc;"
| 3 || October 10 || Los Angeles Kings || 5–4 OT || 2–1–0 || 4 || 
|- style="background:#fcf;"
| 4 || October 12 || @ New York Islanders || 1–5 || 2–2–0 || 4 || 
|- style="background:#fcf;"
| 5 || October 13 || Calgary Flames || 0–1 || 2–3–0 || 4 || 
|- style="background:#fcf;"
| 6 || October 15 || @ Los Angeles Kings || 2–3 || 2–4–0 || 4 || 
|- style="background:#cfc;"
| 7 || October 16 || @ Mighty Ducks of Anaheim || 4–3 || 3–4–0 || 6 || 
|- style="background:#cfc;"
| 8 || October 18 || @ Phoenix Coyotes || 3–1 || 4–4–0 || 8 || 
|- style="background:#cfc;"
| 9 || October 22 || Mighty Ducks of Anaheim || 3–0 || 5–4–0 || 10 || 
|- style="background:#fcf;"
| 10 || October 26 || @ Montreal Canadiens || 5–6 || 5–5–0 || 10 || 
|- style="background:#fcf;"
| 11 || October 27 || Florida Panthers || 2–3 || 5–6–0 || 10 || 
|- style="background:#fcf;"
| 12 || October 30 || @ Washington Capitals || 2–4 || 5–7–0 || 10 || 
|- style="background:#cfc;"
| 13 || October 31 || @ Tampa Bay Lightning || 4–3 || 6–7–0 || 12 || 
|-

|- style="background:#cfc;"
| 14 || November 2 || @ Florida Panthers || 3–2 || 7–7–0 || 14 || 
|- style="background:#fcf;"
| 15 || November 4 || New York Islanders || 3–4 || 7–8–0 || 14 || 
|- style="background:#cfc;"
| 16 || November 7 || @ Buffalo Sabres || 5–2 || 8–8–0 || 16 || 
|- style="background:#fcf;"
| 17 || November 9 || Chicago Blackhawks || 1–4 || 8–9–0 || 16 || 
|- style="background:#cfc;"
| 18 || November 10 || Toronto Maple Leafs || 3–1 || 9–9–0 || 18 || 
|- style="background:#cfc;"
| 19 || November 13 || @ New York Rangers || 2–1 || 10–9–0 || 20 || 
|- style="background:#fcf;"
| 20 || November 14 || Washington Capitals || 2–5 || 10–10–0 || 20 || 
|- style="background:#ffc;"
| 21 || November 16 || San Jose Sharks || 2–2 OT || 10–10–1 || 21 || 
|- style="background:#cfc;"
| 22 || November 21 || Pittsburgh Penguins || 7–3 || 11–10–1 || 23 || 
|- style="background:#cfc;"
| 23 || November 23 || @ Tampa Bay Lightning || 2–1 || 12–10–1 || 25 || 
|- style="background:#fcf;"
| 24 || November 26 || @ Boston Bruins || 0–2 || 12–11–1 || 25 || 
|- style="background:#fcf;"
| 25 || November 27 || @ New York Islanders || 1–4 || 12–12–1 || 25 || 
|- style="background:#cfc;"
| 26 || November 30 || @ Ottawa Senators || 4–3 || 13–12–1 || 27 || 
|-

|- style="background:#cfc;"
| 27 || December 1 || Vancouver Canucks || 4–3 || 14–12–1 || 29 || 
|- style="background:#ffc;"
| 28 || December 4 || @ New York Rangers || 1–1 OT || 14–12–2 || 30 || 
|- style="background:#cfc;"
| 29 || December 6 || @ Dallas Stars || 6–3 || 15–12–2 || 32 || 
|- style="background:#cfc;"
| 30 || December 10 || Florida Panthers || 5–4 || 16–12–2 || 34 || 
|- style="background:#cfc;"
| 31 || December 12 || Hartford Whalers || 3–2 || 17–12–2 || 36 || 
|- style="background:#cfc;"
| 32 || December 14 || @ Hartford Whalers || 4–0 || 18–12–2 || 38 || 
|- style="background:#cfc;"
| 33 || December 15 || Boston Bruins || 6–0 || 19–12–2 || 40 || 
|- style="background:#cfc;"
| 34 || December 19 || New York Islanders || 5–0 || 20–12–2 || 42 || 
|- style="background:#cfc;"
| 35 || December 21 || St. Louis Blues || 4–0 || 21–12–2 || 44 || 
|- style="background:#ffc;"
| 36 || December 22 || @ Chicago Blackhawks || 2–2 OT || 21–12–3 || 45 || 
|- style="background:#cfc;"
| 37 || December 27 || @ Edmonton Oilers || 6–4 || 22–12–3 || 47 || 
|- style="background:#cfc;"
| 38 || December 29 || @ Calgary Flames || 4–2 || 23–12–3 || 49 || 
|- style="background:#cfc;"
| 39 || December 31 || @ Vancouver Canucks || 5–3 || 24–12–3 || 51 || 
|-

|- style="background:#cfc;"
| 40 || January 2 || @ San Jose Sharks || 4–1 || 25–12–3 || 53 || 
|- style="background:#ffc;"
| 41 || January 4 || @ Colorado Avalanche || 4–4 OT || 25–12–4 || 54 || 
|- style="background:#cfc;"
| 42 || January 7 || Boston Bruins || 7–3 || 26–12–4 || 56 || 
|- style="background:#fcf;"
| 43 || January 9 || Tampa Bay Lightning || 1–3 || 26–13–4 || 56 || 
|- style="background:#ffc;"
| 44 || January 11 || Washington Capitals || 3–3 OT || 26–13–5 || 57 || 
|- style="background:#cfc;"
| 45 || January 14 || Montreal Canadiens || 3–2 || 27–13–5 || 59 || 
|- style="background:#ffc;"
| 46 || January 21 || Dallas Stars || 3–3 OT || 27–13–6 || 60 || 
|- style="background:#ffc;"
| 47 || January 22 || @ Detroit Red Wings || 2–2 OT || 27–13–7 || 61 || 
|- style="background:#fcf;"
| 48 || January 25 || Detroit Red Wings || 1–4 || 27–14–7 || 61 || 
|- style="background:#cfc;"
| 49 || January 28 || Phoenix Coyotes || 4–1 || 28–14–7 || 63 || 
|- style="background:#cfc;"
| 50 || January 29 || @ Washington Capitals || 2–1 || 29–14–7 || 65 || 
|-

|- style="background:#fcf;"
| 51 || February 1 || New York Rangers || 2–4 || 29–15–7 || 65 || 
|- style="background:#ffc;"
| 52 || February 4 || Buffalo Sabres || 1–1 OT || 29–15–8 || 66 || 
|- style="background:#cfc;"
| 53 || February 6 || Montreal Canadiens || 9–5 || 30–15–8 || 68 || 
|- style="background:#fcf;"
| 54 || February 8 || @ New Jersey Devils || 2–4 || 30–16–8 || 68 || 
|- style="background:#cfc;"
| 55 || February 13 || Ottawa Senators || 4–2 || 31–16–8 || 70 || 
|- style="background:#cfc;"
| 56 || February 15 || Pittsburgh Penguins || 5–1 || 32–16–8 || 72 || 
|- style="background:#cfc;"
| 57 || February 16 || @ Pittsburgh Penguins || 6–2 || 33–16–8 || 74 || 
|- style="background:#ffc;"
| 58 || February 19 || Hartford Whalers || 2–2 OT || 33–16–9 || 75 || 
|- style="background:#fcf;"
| 59 || February 20 || @ Tampa Bay Lightning || 2–5 || 33–17–9 || 75 || 
|- style="background:#cfc;"
| 60 || February 22 || @ Florida Panthers || 4–3 OT || 34–17–9 || 77 || 
|- style="background:#cfc;"
| 61 || February 23 || New York Rangers || 2–1 || 35–17–9 || 79 || 
|- style="background:#cfc;"
| 62 || February 26 || @ Ottawa Senators || 8–5 || 36–17–9 || 81 || 
|-

|- style="background:#ffc;"
| 63 || March 1 || @ Boston Bruins || 5–5 OT || 36–17–10 || 82 || 
|- style="background:#cfc;"
| 64 || March 2 || @ Hartford Whalers || 5–2 || 37–17–10 || 84 || 
|- style="background:#fcf;"
| 65 || March 5 || New Jersey Devils || 1–3 || 37–18–10 || 84 || 
|- style="background:#fcf;"
| 66 || March 8 || @ Pittsburgh Penguins || 2–3 OT || 37–19–10 || 84 || 
|- style="background:#cfc;"
| 67 || March 9 || Washington Capitals || 5–0 || 38–19–10 || 86 || 
|- style="background:#fcf;"
| 68 || March 11 || @ Buffalo Sabres || 2–3 OT || 38–20–10 || 86 || 
|- style="background:#cfc;"
| 69 || March 13 || Edmonton Oilers || 5–4 OT || 39–20–10 || 88 || 
|- style="background:#fcf;"
| 70 || March 15 || Buffalo Sabres || 5–7 || 39–21–10 || 88 || 
|- style="background:#cfc;"
| 71 || March 19 || @ Toronto Maple Leafs || 6–3 || 40–21–10 || 90 || 
|- style="background:#ffc;"
| 72 || March 22 || @ New York Islanders || 3–3 OT || 40–21–11 || 91 || 
|- style="background:#cfc;"
| 73 || March 23 || Colorado Avalanche || 2–0 || 41–21–11 || 93 || 
|- style="background:#cfc;"
| 74 || March 25 || @ New Jersey Devils || 4–3 || 42–21–11 || 95 || 
|- style="background:#cfc;"
| 75 || March 29 || @ Washington Capitals || 5–3 || 43–21–11 || 97 || 
|- style="background:#fcf;"
| 76 || March 30 || @ St. Louis Blues || 2–3 || 43–22–11 || 97 || 
|-

|- style="background:#ffc;"
| 77 || April 1 || Tampa Bay Lightning || 1–1 OT || 43–22–12 || 98 || 
|- style="background:#cfc;"
| 78 || April 6 || Ottawa Senators || 2–1 || 44–22–12 || 100 || 
|- style="background:#fcf;"
| 79 || April 7 || @ New York Rangers || 2–3 || 44–23–12 || 100 || 
|- style="background:#fcf;"
| 80 || April 10 || New York Rangers || 3–6 || 44–24–12 || 100 || 
|- style="background:#ffc;"
| 81 || April 12 || @ Montreal Canadiens || 3–3 OT || 44–24–13 || 101 || 
|- style="background:#cfc;"
| 82 || April 13 || New Jersey Devils || 5–4 || 45–24–13 || 103 || 
|-

|-
| Legend:

Playoffs

|- style="background:#cfc;"
| 1 || April 17 || Pittsburgh Penguins || 5–1 || Flyers lead 1–0 || 
|- style="background:#cfc;"
| 2 || April 19 || Pittsburgh Penguins || 3–2 || Flyers lead 2–0 || 
|- style="background:#cfc;"
| 3 || April 21 || @ Pittsburgh Penguins || 5–3 || Flyers lead 3–0 || 
|- style="background:#fcf;"
| 4 || April 23 || @ Pittsburgh Penguins || 1–4 || Flyers lead 3–1 || 
|- style="background:#cfc;"
| 5 || April 26 || Pittsburgh Penguins || 6–3 || Flyers win 4–1 || 
|-

|- style="background:#cfc;"
| 1 || May 3 || @ Buffalo Sabres || 5–3 || Flyers lead 1–0 || 
|- style="background:#cfc;"
| 2 || May 5 || @ Buffalo Sabres || 2–1 || Flyers lead 2–0 || 
|- style="background:#cfc;"
| 3 || May 7 || Buffalo Sabres || 4–1 || Flyers lead 3–0 || 
|- style="background:#fcf;"
| 4 || May 9 || Buffalo Sabres || 4–5 OT || Flyers lead 3–1 || 
|- style="background:#cfc;"
| 5 || May 11 || @ Buffalo Sabres || 6–3 || Flyers win 4–1 || 
|-

|- style="background:#cfc;"
| 1 || May 16 || New York Rangers || 3–1 || Flyers lead 1–0 || 
|- style="background:#fcf;"
| 2 || May 18 || New York Rangers || 4–5 || Series tied 1–1 || 
|- style="background:#cfc;"
| 3 || May 20 || @ New York Rangers || 6–3 || Flyers lead 2–1 || 
|- style="background:#cfc;"
| 4 || May 23 || @ New York Rangers || 3–2 || Flyers lead 3–1 || 
|- style="background:#cfc;"
| 5 || May 25 || New York Rangers || 4–2 || Flyers win 4–1 || 
|-

|- style="background:#fcf;"
| 1 || May 31 || Detroit Red Wings || 2–4 || Red Wings lead 1–0 || 
|- style="background:#fcf;"
| 2 || June 3 || Detroit Red Wings || 2–4 || Red Wings lead 2–0 || 
|- style="background:#fcf;"
| 3 || June 5 || @ Detroit Red Wings || 1–6 || Red Wings lead 3–0 || 
|- style="background:#fcf;"
| 4 || June 7 || @ Detroit Red Wings || 1–2 || Red Wings win 4–0 || 
|-

|-
| Legend:

Player statistics

Scoring
 Position abbreviations: C = Center; D = Defense; G = Goaltender; LW = Left Wing; RW = Right Wing
  = Joined team via a transaction (e.g., trade, waivers, signing) during the season. Stats reflect time with the Flyers only.
  = Left team via a transaction (e.g., trade, waivers, release) during the season. Stats reflect time with the Flyers only.

Goaltending

Awards and records

Awards

Records

Among the team records set during the 1996–97 season was goaltender Ron Hextall tying a team record with nine consecutive wins from December 6 to January 7. During Hextall’s streak the team set two shutout streaks, going a team record 265 minutes and eight seconds without allowing a goal from December 12 to December 22, and recording four consecutive shutouts from December 14 to December 21 (tied during the 1998–99 season). On January 29, Rod Brind'Amour tied Rick MacLeish's team record for consecutive games played at 287. Brind'Amour's streak continued another two seasons until a fractured left foot during training camp caused him to miss the first 34 games of the 1999–2000 season, ending the streak at 484 games.

The Legion of Doom line of Eric Lindros, John LeClair, and Mikael Renberg had two record setting games in February. On February 6 against the Montreal Canadiens, the line combined for a team record 16 points (LeClair 6 points, Lindros 5, and Renberg 5) with LeClair tying a team regular season record with four goals in the game. Three weeks later on February 26 against the Ottawa Senators, the line again recorded a combined 16 points (Lindros 7 points, Renberg 5, and LeClair 4) with Lindros setting the team records for assists in a single game (6) and a single period (4, later tied). Lindros also tied the team record for points in a single period (4). On March 19, Lindros tied the team regular season record for goals scored in a game (4) and tied the team record for goals in a period (3). Janne Niinimaa’s 40 assists on the season set a team record for rookie defensemen.

During game three of their conference quarterfinals series against the Pittsburgh Penguins, the Flyers set a franchise single period playoff record for most shots on goal (28). During game three, Rod Brind’Amour tied the NHL records for most shorthanded goals scored in a playoff game and playoff period (2 for both). Likewise, the two total shorthanded goals scored by the Flyers is also tied for the franchise single playoff game and playoff period records. John LeClair’s three game-winning goals during the series is a franchise single series high. During game three of their conference semifinals series against the Buffalo Sabres, defenseman Paul Coffey recorded three assists during the first period, tying the franchise single playoff period mark. Brind’Amour repeated Coffey’s feat during the second period of game five. The Flyers five consecutive playoff wins on the road from May 3 to May 23 tied a team record.

Milestones

Transactions
The Flyers were involved in the following transactions from June 12, 1996, the day after the deciding game of the 1996 Stanley Cup Finals, through June 7, 1997, the day of the deciding game of the 1997 Stanley Cup Finals.

Trades

Players acquired

Players lost

Signings

Draft picks

Philadelphia's picks at the 1996 NHL Entry Draft, which was held at the Kiel Center in St. Louis, Missouri, on June 22, 1996. The Flyers traded their first-round pick, 24th overall, their fourth-round pick, 106th overall, and Martin Spanhel to the San Jose Sharks for Pat Falloon on September 20, 1995. They also traded their third-round pick, 78th overall, and their sixth-round pick, 157th overall, to the Colorado Avalanche for Garth Snow on July 12, 1995, and their ninth-round pick, 239th overall, to the Ottawa Senators for Kerry Huffman on March 19, 1996.

Farm teams
The Flyers were affiliated with the Philadelphia Phantoms of the AHL and the Mobile Mysticks of the ECHL.

Notes

References
General
 
 
 
Specific

P
P
1996
1996-1997
2
Philadelphia
Philadelphia